Matthias Bonvehi (born November 14, 1989) is an American-Argentine soccer player.

Playing career

Amateur 
Bonhevi played college soccer at Cal State Northridge between 2007 and 2011, including a red-shirted year in 2008.

Club career 
Out of college, Bonhevi signed with German fifth-tier side TV Echterdingen in 2012, before moving to Filipino club Stallion FC, where he won the United Football League Cup. He signed with United Soccer League club Sacramento Republic on March 10, 2015.

Isidro Metapán 
Bonvehi signed with Isidro Metapán of the Salvadoran Primera División for the Apertura 2017 tournament. He scored his first goal for Isidro Metapán in a 2–1 victory against Sonsonate in the Estadio Anna Mercedes Campos, in September 2017. Bonvehi also scored in a 2–1 victory against Municipal Limeño in the Estadio Jorge Calero Suárez, in November 2017.

References 

1989 births
Living people
Soccer players from California
American soccer players
Association football defenders
Cal State Northridge Matadors men's soccer players
Sacramento Republic FC players
A.D. Isidro Metapán footballers
USL Championship players